Due Season is the first studio album by American rapper Kia Shine. It was released on July 31, 2007 through Universal Records. Production was handled by Play-N-Skillz, Rap Hustlaz, Street Knock, T-Mix, Triz Wiz and Young Sean. It features guest appearances from Jack Frost, Wifey, 8Ball & MJG, Erika "Kane" Yancey and Jim Jones. The album peaked at number 84 on the US Billboard 200, number sixteen on the Top R&B/Hip-Hop Albums chart. The bonus track "Due Season" is about how Shine became a rapper and producer.

Track listing

Chart positions

References

External links

2007 debut albums
Universal Records albums
Hip hop albums by American artists